John Purvey (c. 1354 – c. 1414) was an English theologian, reformer, and disciple of John Wycliffe. He was born around 1354 in Lathbury, near Newport Pagnell in the county of Buckinghamshire, England. He was a great scholar, permitted to enter all priestly ranks on 13 March 1377, or 1378. It has been assumed by scholars that Purvey became acquainted with Wycliffe's ideas in Oxford. In around 1382, Purvey lived with Wycliffe at Lutterworth, Leicestershire, along with Nicholas of Hereford and John Aston, and became one of Wycliffe's disciples.

Wycliffe's disciples were called Lollards; a name perhaps derived the medieval Dutch word meaning "to mutter". This reflected the Dutch's views on worship through their reading of the Scripture. The most important group of Lollards were a group of knights who were a part of the king's court. Sir William Neville, Sir John Montague and Sir William Beachamp were a part of this group and had the support of the Black Prince and his younger brother John of Gaunt, reflecting the tradition of noble anticlericalism.

At Lutterworth, Purvey, with Wycliffe's concurrence, revised the 1382 English translation of the Bible, originally done by Wycliffe and Nicholas of Hereford. The primary purpose of the revision was to make the translation more accessible as well as comprehensible. The 1382 translation was a verbatim rendering of the Vulgate and had little consideration for the differences between the Latin and the English, making the version confusing. Purvey described his time translating with Wycliffe; he said that each worked on their manuscripts at opposite ends of a table with an inkwell shared in the middle. Purvey worked separately from Wycliffe, never writing a word for him despite Wycliffe's palsied arm.

They were in the midst of this undertaking when Wycliffe died in 1384. From Lutterworth, Purvey then moved to Bristol, a city that was well known at the time for its sympathies of Wycliffe and his followers. Meanwhile in 1387, Purvey, Hereford, Aston, Parker, and Swynderby were banned from preaching by Henry Wakefield, the bishop of Worcester, and were then amalgamated at a college unlicensed and dismissed by law from practising preaching. Purvey finished his revised version of the Bible in 1388.

He then ignored the ban and later admitted to preaching across the country. In the infamous prologue to his version of the Bible, he unravels the method of " a poor catiff lettid fro prehying" and discusses the meaning and renders it "myche travile, with diverse felawis and helperis." He also delves in the ideas how a labourer at Scripture hath "nede to live a clene life, and with good livyng and great traviel" meaning to come to "trewe understanding of holi writ." It has been said that Purvey's translation was free from bias and was so widely accepted that it was owned by obedient churchmen and bishops alike. Purvey, as one of the poor preachers whom Wycliffe had organised before his death, continued to spread Wycliffe's views. In 1388, a commission was sent to all bishops to watch for heretical writings by Purvey and Wycliffe's disciples.

Ultimately, Purvey was accused of preaching heresy. Archbishop Arundel investigated Purvey's teachings and found several counts of heresy including the invalidity of wrongful excommunication, and the ineffectuality of papal law. He was imprisoned in 1390. Nonetheless he continued to write various works, including commentaries, sermons and treatises condemning what he perceived to be the corruptions of the Catholic Church. By 1401, he was brought before convocation and, unable to face death by burning, like that of William Sawtrey, he recanted at St Paul's Cross in London and returned to orthodoxy. He confessed on 6 March 1401 and revoked his heresies.

Afterwards Purvey was left alone, and by the end of 1401 he was inducted to the vicarage of West Hythe in Kent. But like other followers of Wycliffe who had recanted, he was ill at ease at his betrayal. In 1403, he resigned from his parish, and for the next eighteen years he preached wherever he could. In 1407, Purvey was named as a participant in the Oldcastle rebellion in Derbyshire and Warwickshire. He was arrested by 12 January and was held at Newgate Prison in London. He died of natural causes on 16 May 1414.

See also 
 Ecclesiae Regimen
 General Prologue of the Wycliffe Bible

References

Sources 
 Ward & Trent, et al. The Cambridge History of English and American Literature. New York: G.P. Putnam’s Sons, 1907–21; New York: Bartleby.com, 2000. Web. 21 October 2012.

English theologians
Lollards
1361 births
1429 deaths
14th-century English Roman Catholic priests
15th-century English Roman Catholic priests
English male non-fiction writers